Britt Harley Hager (born February 20, 1966, in Odessa, Texas) is a former American football linebacker who played nine seasons in the National Football League for the Philadelphia Eagles, Denver Broncos and St. Louis Rams.  He played college football at the University of Texas and was drafted in the third round of the 1989 NFL Draft. Britt Hager, was one of the most prolific tacklers in University of Texas history, setting a school record in 1988 with 195 tackles after setting the previous school record with 187 the year before. He also holds the career Texas record with 499 tackles while in Austin.

 

1966 births
Living people
American football linebackers
People from Odessa, Texas
Philadelphia Eagles players
Denver Broncos players
St. Louis Rams players
Texas Longhorns football players